Oregon City Service Learning Academy is a public high school focused on service learning in Oregon City, Oregon, United States. Until the end of the 2011–2012 school year, the school was located on the campus of the Oregon City High School.  It is currently located at the King Campus (formerly King Elementary School).

Academics
In 2008, 58% of the school's seniors received their high school diploma. Of 19 students, 11 graduated, 5 dropped out, and 3 are still in high school.

References

High schools in Clackamas County, Oregon
Buildings and structures in Oregon City, Oregon
Public high schools in Oregon
2006 establishments in Oregon